Jean-Pierre Mabula Hakiri (born 15 July 1987) is a Rwandan footballer who is last known to have played for Sydney Olympic in Australia in 2016.

Australia

Participating in three test matches with Sydney Olympic in Australia in summer 2016, Hariri was bean training with them by the 3rd of July and was supposed to a seal a 2-year deal, debuting when Olympic conceded 0-2 to Rockdale City Suns, showing industrious efforts despite picking up a red card on the 75th minute.

Personal life

The Rwandan is a Christian and married in 2015.

References

External links
 at National-Football-Teams 
 SportsTG Profile

1987 births
Living people
Rwandan expatriate footballers
Rayon Sports F.C. players
Sydney Olympic FC players
Rwandan footballers
Association football defenders
Expatriate soccer players in Australia
Rwanda international footballers
Rwandan Christians